Dmitriy Forshev (born 30 May 1976) is a Russian sprinter who specializes in the 400 metres.

Forshev won the silver medal in 4 x 400 metres relay at the 2004 World Indoor Championships, together with teammates Boris Gorban, Andrey Rudnitskiy and Aleksandr Usov. At the 2005 European Indoor Championships Forshev finished fourth in 400 m and third in 4x400 m relay. Later that year the relay team finished seventh at the 2005 World Championships with Forshev, Rudnitskiy, Oleg Mishukov and Yevgeniy Lebedev.

His personal best time is 45.62 seconds, achieved in June 2003 in Florence.

External links

1976 births
Living people
Russian male sprinters
World Athletics Championships athletes for Russia
World Athletics Indoor Championships medalists
Russian Athletics Championships winners